Lieutenant-Colonel The Hon. Sir Cecil James Frederick Campbell  (4 May 1891 – 11 May 1952) was an amateur Irish tennis player, lawyer and businessman. He reached the quarterfinals of Wimbledon for three consecutive years between 1921 and 1923.

Biography

He was the second son of Irish peer James Campbell, 1st Baron Glenavy, who served as Attorney-General for Ireland and Lord Chief Justice of Ireland. Cecil was considered the best Irish tennis player of his era.

On 23 May 1925 in London, Campbell married Lavender Letts, a fellow tennis player from Essex. She competed for Ireland in women's singles at the 1929 Wimbledon Championships, and they competed together in mixed doubles at Wimbledon in 1928 and 1929.

Campbell moved to Egypt in 1922, where until 1930 he served as legal secretary to the Financial Adviser to the Egyptian Government. He later became legal counsellor to the British resident in Cairo. In 1933, he became managing director of the Marconi Radio Telephone Company of Egypt, and later chairman of the local board of the Anglo-Egyptian Oilfields.

In 1934, Lavender successfully sued for divorce on the grounds of her husband's adultery with the wife of a British civil servant in Cairo. Cecil remarried the same year.

He was named a Companion of the Order of St Michael and St George in the 1930 New Year Honours After his service in the Second World War, he received a knighthood.

From 1947 to the time of his death, he was president of the English Chamber of Commerce in Egypt.

On 11 May 1952, he was found dead of a gunshot wound at his home in Zamalek, Cairo, after suffering "indifferent health for a long time," according to The Times.

References

External links
 
 
 

Irish male tennis players
1891 births
1952 suicides
Knights Commander of the Order of the British Empire
Companions of the Order of St Michael and St George
Deaths by firearm in Egypt
Tennis players from Dublin (city)
Suicides by firearm in Egypt